The 58th Battalion, CEF was an infantry battalion of the Canadian Expeditionary Force during World War I.

History 
The battalion was authorized on 20 April 1915. The battalion recruited in central Ontario and was mobilized at Niagara-on-the-Lake, Ontario. It embarked for Great Britain on 22 November 1915. It disembarked in France on 22 February 1916, where it fought as part of the 9th Infantry Brigade, 3rd Canadian Division in France and Flanders until the end of the war.

Corporal Harry Miner of the 58th Battalion was posthumously awarded the Victoria Cross for his actions on 8 August 1918 at Demuin, France, during the Battle of Amiens, the start of the Hundred Days Offensive.

The battalion was disbanded on 15 September 1920.

Perpetuation 
The 58th Battalion, CEF was first perpetuated by The Royal Grenadiers. In 1936, after the regiment was Amalgamated with The Toronto Regiment, the perpetuation is now continued by The Royal Regiment of Canada .

Commanding Officers 
The 58th Battalion had two Officers Commanding:
Lt.-Col. H.J. Genet, DSO, 22 November 1915 – 11 January 1918 
Lt.-Col. R.A. McFarlane, DSO, 12 January 1918-Demobilization

Battle honours 
The 58th Battalion was awarded the following battle honours:
MOUNT SORREL
SOMME, 1916
Flers-Courcelette
Ancre Heights
ARRAS, 1917, '18
Vimy, 1917
HILL 70
Ypres 1917
Passchendaele
AMIENS
Scarpe, 1918
Drocourt-Quéant
HINDENBURG LINE
Canal du Nord
Cambrai, 1918
PURSUIT TO MONS
FRANCE AND FLANDERS, 1916-18

See also 
 List of infantry battalions in the Canadian Expeditionary Force

References

 Meek, John F. Over the Top! The Canadian Infantry in the First World War. Orangeville, Ont.: The Author, 1971. 
 Canadian Expeditionary Force 1914-1919 by Col. G.W.L. Nicholson, CD, Queen's Printer, Ottawa, Ontario, 1962

058
Military units and formations of Ontario
Military units and formations disestablished in 1920